Ceri Thomas is a British executive who is the director of public affairs and communication at Oxford University. A former radio news producer and media executive, he is a former editor of the BBC Radio 4's Today programme and BBC One's Panorama.

Education
Thomas attended the St Bartholomew's School in Newbury, Berkshire, England. Attending college starting 1981, he received a Bachelor of Arts with a major in French studies from the then Victoria University of Manchester (now the University of Manchester) in 1985.

Career

LBC and BBC Radio
Thomas began his career in broadcasting at London's LBC in 1989 as a producer, remaining with the station until 1991.

He moved to BBC Radio 4 to work as a junior producer with the Today programme in 1995, working on the programme from 1991 to 1997. He was promoted to a senior role on Today in 1995, before later moving to BBC Radio 5 Live in 1998. Initially, a producer for the breakfast programme, Thomas later became Head of News at 5 Live, leaving in 2004. He was subsequently appointed as the BBC's Editor of Newsgathering, before taking a year-long sabbatical to work as a Nieman Fellow in Journalism at Harvard University. On returning to the BBC in 2006, he became editor of Radio 4's Today programme.

In March 2010, while discussing the domination of male presenters on the Today programme during an interview on Radio 4's Feedback (only one out of five was then female), he suggested the show was too tough an environment for women, although he did also say the mix of male and female on the programme was "not ideal". Shortly afterwards, he wrote in a Guardian article that the comments had been meant in the context of "a wider news world in which women have not been well represented in senior positions".

BBC Television
In November 2012, Thomas was appointed Acting Deputy Director of News at the BBC after the then incumbent, Stephen Mitchell stepped aside in the wake of the controversy surrounding a report on the BBC Two current affairs programme Newsnight. A clandestine visit to North Korea in March 2013 for an edition of Panorama involving the journalist John Sweeney and a group of students from the London School of Economics led to discontent between the BBC and the university with claims that the students lives had been put at risk without their consent. Thomas described the programme as "an important piece of public interest journalism" and defended putting the students lives at risk.

Thomas formally began work as editor of Panorama in October 2014. He had been acting editor since the previous May when his predecessor, Tom Giles, had stepped down.

It was announced in June 2016 that he was leaving the BBC to take up a post as the director of public affairs and communication at Oxford University. He assumed this role in the autumn of 2016. Thomas was succeeded by Rachel Jupp as the editor of Panorama.

References

External links

BBC executives
BBC News people
BBC Radio 4
Alumni of the University of Manchester
British radio executives
Living people
Nieman Fellows
Panorama (British TV programme)
People educated at St. Bartholomew's School
People from Newbury, Berkshire
BBC Radio 5 Live
Year of birth missing (living people)